The Church of Jesus Christ of Latter-day Saints (LDS Church) operates 410 missions throughout the world. Most current missions are named after the location of the mission headquarters, usually a specific city.  The geographical area a mission actually covers is often much larger than the name may indicate; most areas of the world are within the jurisdiction of a mission of the church. In the list below, if the name of the mission does not include a specific city, the city where the mission headquarters is located is included in parentheses.

As of July 2022, there are 410 missions in the church.

By country/territory
List of missions within each country, territory or dependency. Africa North (AN), North America à(NA), and South America (SA) are abbreviated for concise column and reduction of row height for most rows.

U.S. State
Missions in each state of the United States. North America (NA) was abbreviated for concise column and reduction of row height for most rows.

The United States and Canada are divided into multiple areas which follow mission boundaries and not state or provincial Boundaries. The dominant area within the state/province is listed under "Area" column. Any mission in a state or province located in a different area not shown in the "Area" column will its area name shown in parenthesis.

By continent

Mission by year of formation
The following is a list of missions listed in order of creation date. The first mission president's name and previous names the mission is also provided. Discontinued missions are typically the result of missions being consolidated with missionary efforts still continuing. Although, occasionally missions will be discontinued as a result of government restrictions, military conflict and/or other issues affecting the safety of missionaries serving in the area.

See also

The Church of Jesus Christ of Latter-day Saints membership history
The Church of Jesus Christ of Latter-day Saints membership statistics

Notes

References

List of missions
Organizational subdivisions of the Church of Jesus Christ of Latter-day Saints